Yana Kramarenko (born June 11, 2002 in Israel) is an Israeli individual and group rhythmic gymnast. She is the 2020 European Group All-around champion.

Career

Junior
Yana was a member of junior team that represented Israel at the 2016 Junior European Championships in Holon, Israel and placed 4th in Team competition. She placed 8th in Rope Qualifications and 23rd in Ball Qualifications. In 2017, she joined Israeli junior group and competed at International Tournament Alina Cup in Moscow, where they took silver medal in Group All-around behind Russia. At the 2017 Junior European Championships in Budapest, Hungary they won bronze medal in 10 Clubs final.

Senior
In 2019, she joined Israeli senior group. They placed 6th in Group All-around at the 2019 World Championships in Baku, Azerbaijan. 

In November 2020, they won gold medal at the 2020 European Championships in Group All-around and silver in Team competition.

References

External links
 
 
 

Israeli rhythmic gymnasts
2002 births
Living people
Medalists at the Rhythmic Gymnastics European Championships
Olympic gymnasts of Israel
Gymnasts at the 2020 Summer Olympics